Bill Nighy is an English actor of the stage and screen.

He has won a British Academy Film Award for his comedic supporting performance in Richard Curtis' romantic comedy Love Actually (2003). He received a British Academy Television Award for his performance in State of Play (2003). Over his career he has earned three Golden Globe Award nominations for his performances in The Girl in the Café (2005), Gideon's Daughter (2006), and Page Eight (2011). In 2015, he received a Tony Award nomination for Best Leading Actor in a Play starring opposite Carey Mulligan in the Broadway revival of David Hare's Skylight.

Major associations

Academy Awards

BAFTA Awards

British Independent Film Awards

Golden Globe Awards

Screen Actors Guild Awards

Laurence Olivier Awards

Tony Awards

Other awards

Annie Awards

Critics Choice Awards

Evening Standard British Film Awards

Goya Awards

MTV Movie Awards

Satellite Awards

Saturn Awards

Teen Choice Awards

Critics awards

References

External links

 
 Bill Nighy: A Life in Pictures Interview at BAFTA
 
 
 Silk Sound Books

Lists of awards received by British actor